McCallum Manor is a historic apartment building located in the Mount Airy neighborhood of Philadelphia, Pennsylvania. It is located next to Malvern Hall. It was built in 1925, and is a nine-story, "H"-shaped, reinforced concrete building faced in brick in a Federal Revival-style.  It features terra cotta decorative elements.

It was added to the National Register of Historic Places in 1985.

References

Residential buildings on the National Register of Historic Places in Philadelphia
Federal architecture in Pennsylvania
Residential buildings completed in 1925
Mount Airy, Philadelphia